Alim Latrèche (born 5 December 1979) is a French retired wheelchair fencer who competes at international fencing competitions. He is a Paralympic champion, double World champion and three-time European champion in épée.

References

External links
 
 

1979 births
Living people
Sportspeople from Grenoble
Paralympic wheelchair fencers of France
Wheelchair fencers at the 2004 Summer Paralympics
Wheelchair fencers at the 2008 Summer Paralympics
Wheelchair fencers at the 2012 Summer Paralympics
Medalists at the 2004 Summer Paralympics
Medalists at the 2012 Summer Paralympics